Aneme Wake, or Abia, is a Papuan language spoken in Oro Province, in the Papuan Peninsula.

References 

Languages of Papua New Guinea
Languages of Oro Province
Yareban languages